Route 375 is a  long east–west secondary highway in the northwest portion of New Brunswick, Canada.

The route's northeastern terminus is in the community of Lower Portage at Route 130. The road travels west, passing under Route 2 (Trans-Canada Highway) (no direct access), before passing Pines Lake and continuing to the US Border at the Limestone - Gillespie Portage Border Crossing near Limestone, Maine, where it becomes Maine State Route 229.

See also

References

External links

375
375